John Maltby (1936 – 22 December 2020) was a distinguished English sculptor and studio potter.

Education and career 

John Maltby was born and brought up in Cleethorpes in Lincolnshire. He attended Clee Grammar School, then went on study for a degree at Leicester College of Art specialising in sculpture and then Goldsmiths College in South London. 
After a period of teaching art at a small private boys' school at Caterham in Surrey near London, he visited Bernard Leach after reading Leach's A Potter's book. On Leach's advice Maltby joined his son David Leach in 1962 at Lowerdown Pottery in Bovey Tracey, Devon where he was Leach's apprentice for nearly two years. He then set up his own pottery at Stoneshill near Crediton in 1964.

Maltby was a member of the Craft Potters Association and the British Crafts Centre, he was also an advisor to the Leach Archive.

His work has been exhibited worldwide and is represented in many public collections including Victoria and Albert Museum.
Maltby's life and work was celebrated in a retrospective exhibition and accompanying book in the summer of 2022 at the Yew Tree Gallery, Morvah, Cornwall

Style 
His early pieces were in the Leach Anglo-Japanese style. It was after he set up his own pottery his individual style developed. From an early age he loved the sea and this remained an influence throughout his career as were his European travels and abstract artists. Following a major heart operation in 1996 Maltby was unable to undertake the work of kneading clay and manipulating large pieces, this lead him to start making smaller more sculptural works.

Personal life 
Maltby's parents were John a fish merchant and his wife Gladys. Whilst at Caterham he met Heather Helmore who was working as the school matron and they married in 1962. They had two children Joe and Philippa. Heather died in 2007 and John in 2020. He was still working in his pottery until shortly before his death.

References 

1936 births
2020 deaths
Alumni of Goldsmiths, University of London
English potters
People from Lincolnshire